The City of Bradford Metropolitan District Council elections were held on Thursday, 2 May 1991, with one third of the council up for election. Labour retained control of the council.

Election result

This result had the following consequences for the total number of seats on the council after the elections:

Ward results

References

1991 English local elections
1991
1990s in West Yorkshire